Almar Orri Atlason (born 28 December 2004) is an Icelandic basketball player and a member of the Icelandic national team programs. He played up through the junior ranks of KR before heading to Italy in 2019 where he joined A.S. Stella Azzurra. He returned to KR the following season and started his senior team career during the 2020–21 season.

In August 2022, Almar Orri joined Sunrise Christian Academy in Kansas, United States.

National team career
In August 2021, he was selected to the U-18 All-First team of the Nordic Tournament after averaging 14 points, 8 rebounds and 2 assists. In 2022, he led Iceland to the semi-finals of FIBA IBA U18 European Championship Division B after posting 22 points, 16 rebounds, 6 assists, 2 blocks in a win against Bosnia and Herzegovina. Following the tournament, he was selected to the FIBA Europe U-20 Championship Division B All-Tournament Team. In July 2022, he was selected to the 26-player training camp of the Icelandic senior national team.

Awards and accomplishments

Individual awards
FIBA Europe U-20 Championship Division B All-Tournament Team: 2022
U-18 Nordic Championship's All-First Team: 2021

Personal life
Almar Orri is the younger brother of basketball coach Darri Freyr Atlason.

References

External links
Icelandic statistics at Icelandic Basketball Association

2004 births
Living people
Icelandic expatriate basketball people in Italy
Icelandic expatriate basketball people in the United States
Icelandic men's basketball players
Almar Orri Atlason
Almar Orri Atlason